Mohammed Al-Rumaihi (born 3 March 1989) is a Qatari sports shooter. He competed in the men's trap event at the 2020 Summer Olympics.

References

External links
 

1989 births
Living people
Qatari male sport shooters
Olympic shooters of Qatar
Shooters at the 2020 Summer Olympics
People from Doha
Shooters at the 2010 Asian Games
Shooters at the 2014 Asian Games
Shooters at the 2018 Asian Games